The Sakhalin Island Arc (Russian Сахалинские острова, Sakhalin Са̄халінскые острава) is an ancient volcanic arc dating from the Early Miocene. The arc was a result of the Okhotsk Plate subducting beneath the Eurasian Plate in the convergence zone. The arc runs from mainland Asia through Sakhalin Island into central Hokkaido and the collision zone around the Daisetsuzan Volcanic Group, where the Kuril Island Arc and the Northeastern Japan Arc meet.

References

Volcanic arcs
Landforms of the Sea of Okhotsk
Geology of Russia
Geology of Japan